The Odia Wikipedia (also known as Oriya Wikipedia and orwiki) is the Odia edition of Wikipedia. It is a free, web-based, collaborative encyclopedia project supported by the non-profit Wikimedia Foundation. The project was started by Suneet Samaetha in June 2002 and reached 1,000 articles in May 2011. This is one of the first four Indic Wikipedias started in 2002, among over 20 Indic language Wikipedias. The first edit on Odia Wikipedia occurred on 3 June 2002.

Growth, coverage and popularity
Started in June 2002, it reached one thousand articles in May 2011.
Odia Wikipedians have organized meetups and workshops in seven different cities like Bhubaneswar, Cuttack, Anugul, Balasore, Bangalore and New Delhi across India. The readership has increased over 300% in the last six months. The page views per month is at 4.38 million. This Wikipedia ranks 134 among the 289 world language Wikipedias, as of 23 August 2015.

Statistics 
The table below contains details of the official Wikipedia statistics under the auspices of the Wikimedia Foundation for Odia language; the given information is the current numbers. Test Wikipedias are listed at the Wikimedia Incubator Wiki project.

The table below contains a details sorted by the number of edits per article.

Wikipedia Report Card: summaries for Odia

References

External links 

  Odia Wikipedia
  Odia Wikipedia mobile
 Wikipedia.org multilingual portal
 Wikimedia Foundation

Internet properties established in 2002
Wikipedias by language
Odia-language mass media
Wikipedia in India